Goetz Richter  is a musician, violinist and teacher. He is Associate Professor and Chair of Strings at the Sydney Conservatorium of Music and Director for the Sydney Symphony Orchestra.

He is involved in music competitions including most recently the Michael Hill International Violin Competition in New Zealand and the Kendall National Violin Competition in Australia.

References 

Australian musicians
Australian violinists
Male violinists
Living people
21st-century violinists
Honorary Members of the Order of Australia
21st-century Australian male musicians
21st-century Australian musicians
Year of birth missing (living people)